Alexander Stalock (born July 28, 1987) is an American professional ice hockey goaltender currently playing for the Chicago Blackhawks of the National Hockey League (NHL). Stalock was originally drafted 112th overall in the 2005 NHL Entry Draft by the San Jose Sharks.

Playing career
Alex Stalock was born in Saint Paul and played high school hockey for the South St. Paul, Minnesota Packers. He attended college at the University of Minnesota Duluth, where he played college hockey for three years before starting his professional career.

On February 1, 2011, he made his NHL debut in relief of Antti Niemi. Playing 29 minutes and 47 seconds, Stalock allowed no goals on nine shots to record his first NHL win in a 5–3 victory over the Phoenix Coyotes. Shortly after his debut he was reassigned to the Sharks minor league affiliate, Worcester Sharks, in the American Hockey League (AHL). In a game against the Manchester Monarchs on February 4, he suffered a sliced nerve behind his knee after being stepped on by the skate of Manchester's Dwight King, sidelining him for the remainder of the 2010–11 season. Afterwards, he had surgery to repair the nerve and went through many months of rehabilitation.  Stalock was sidelined until January 21, 2012, when he started in goal for San Jose's ECHL affiliate, the Stockton Thunder.  After six games in Stockton, Stalock was called up to Worcester.

On July 10, 2013, the San Jose Sharks re-signed Stalock to a one-year contract. In September 2013, Stalock was selected as the San Jose Sharks backup goaltender for the 2013–14 season. Stalock made his first NHL start on October 27, saving 38 shots in a 5–2 victory against the Ottawa Senators.

On January 16, 2014, Stalock recorded his first shutout in a 3–0 win over the Florida Panthers. Against the Los Angeles Kings on January 27, Stalock passed Evgeni Nabokov for the Sharks' longest streak without allowing a goal with 178:55, 7:37 longer than Nabokov's highest. Stalock made his first career playoff start against the Los Angeles Kings on April 28, 2014.

In the 2015–16 season, on February 27, 2016, Stalock's tenure with the Sharks came to an end when he was traded, along with Ben Smith and a conditional 4th round pick in 2018 to the Toronto Maple Leafs in exchange for James Reimer and Jeremy Morin. Stalock was placed on waivers the following day by the Maple Leafs and upon clearing was assigned to the AHL with affiliate, the Toronto Marlies on February 29, 2016.

Stalock left the Leafs organization as a free agent in the off-season and on July 1, 2016, signed a one-year, two-way contract with the Minnesota Wild. On February 2, 2017, the Wild signed Stalock to a two-year, $1.3 million extension. He earned his first shutout with the Wild, and in three seasons, against his former team, the Toronto Maple Leafs, on December 14, 2017. On January 29, 2019, the Wild signed Stalock, to a three-year, $2.355 million extension.

Rehabilitating an injury leading into the pandemic delayed 2020–21 season, Stalock was placed on waivers by the Wild and later claimed by the Edmonton Oilers on March 1, 2021. He missed the entirety of the season through myocarditis, after complications from Covid-19. 

Returning to play in the  season, Stalock was assigned to the Oilers AHL affiliate, the Bakersfield Condors. He recorded 3 wins in 5 appearances before he was traded by the Oilers for future considerations in a return to his original club, the San Jose Sharks, on March 2, 2022.

On July 13, 2022, Stalock signed as a free agent to a one-year, $750,000 contract with the Chicago Blackhawks.

Career statistics

Awards and honors

References

External links

1987 births
Living people
AHCA Division I men's ice hockey All-Americans
American men's ice hockey goaltenders
Bakersfield Condors players
Cedar Rapids RoughRiders players
Chicago Blackhawks players
Iowa Wild players
Ice hockey people from Saint Paul, Minnesota
Minnesota Duluth Bulldogs men's ice hockey players
Minnesota Wild players
Peoria Rivermen (AHL) players
San Jose Barracuda players
San Jose Sharks draft picks
San Jose Sharks players
Stockton Thunder players
Toronto Marlies players
Worcester Sharks players